Dan West (born September 3, 1986) is a Canadian football defensive back. He was initially signed as an undrafted free agent by the Winnipeg Blue Bombers on May 11, 2012 and played for three seasons for the team. After being released by the Blue Bombers during their 2015 training camp, he was signed by the Saskatchewan Roughriders on July 15, 2015. On June 13, 2016, the Roughriders released West, but he was signed by the Redblacks on June 21, 2016. He earned his first Grey Cup Championship ring in 2016 when the Redblacks beat the Calgary Stampeders in overtime.

He played CIS football for the Bishop's Gaiters.

West started out playing tyke football for the Ajax/Pickering Dolphins at the age of 6.

References

External links
Ottawa Redblacks profile 
Saskatchewan Roughriders profile

1986 births
Living people
Canadian football defensive backs
Saskatchewan Roughriders players
Bishop's Gaiters football players
Ottawa Redblacks players
Players of Canadian football from Ontario
People from Ajax, Ontario
Winnipeg Blue Bombers players